Pseudospondias is a genus of plants in the subfamily Spondiadoideae of the cashew and sumac family Anacardiaceae. They grow as dioecious shrubs or trees and are found in forests of Sub-Saharan Africa.

Species
The Plant List and Catalogue of Life recognise about 2 accepted species:
 Pseudospondias longifolia 
 Pseudospondias microcarpa

References

Anacardiaceae
Anacardiaceae genera
Dioecious plants